The D may refer to:

 A nickname for the city of Detroit
 Tenacious D, an American rock band composed of Jack Black and Kyle Gass
 The D Las Vegas, a hotel and casino in Nevada
 A slang term for dick

See also 
 D (disambiguation)